Minnesota State Highway 5 (MN 5) is a  highway in Minnesota, which runs from its intersection with MN 19 and MN 22 in Gaylord and continues east and northeast to its eastern terminus at its intersection with MN 120 in Maplewood. The route passes through downtown Saint Paul.

Route description

State Highway 5 serves as a northeast–southwest route between Gaylord, Norwood Young America, Chanhassen, Eden Prairie, Bloomington, Richfield, downtown Saint Paul, and Maplewood. The State Highway runs though 5 counties. The highway is officially marked as an east–west route by its highway shields from beginning to end.

Part of Highway 5 is designed as a freeway near the Minneapolis–Saint Paul International Airport.

Highway 5 is considered a significant transit corridor, known as the Riverview Corridor, to downtown Saint Paul from the airport and points farther south and west.  There has been discussion of creating a bus rapid transit or light rail line along the highway, much like the METRO Blue Line currently runs rails into downtown Minneapolis along State Highway 55.

Highway 5 is also known as Fort Road and West 7th Street in the city of St. Paul.

 of Highway 5 is officially designated the Augie Mueller Memorial Highway.  This designation is signed from its intersection with State Highway 101 in Chanhassen southwesterly to its intersection with State Highway 19 in Gaylord.

Legally, State Highway 5 is defined as legislative routes 45, 52, 102, 109, 111, and 121 in the Minnesota Statutes.  The route is not marked with those numbers.

History
State Highway 5 was authorized in 1934.  The route was completely paved by 1953.

When Highway 5 was slated for expansion in 1956, the construction threatened to demolish the remains of historic Fort Snelling, near the confluence of the Mississippi and Minnesota rivers. As a result of public outcry, the highway was built in a short tunnel underneath the Fort Snelling site, sparing the fort from destruction. This effort led to archaeological research into the remains of Fort Snelling and its eventual rebuilding as a state park.

From 1934 to 1982, the eastern section of the highway between Saint Paul and Stillwater was originally marked as Minnesota 212, as it once reached old U.S. 212 in Saint Paul, but that segment was re-numbered as an extension of Highway 5 . This segment is still marked with the mileposts from 212, which were a continuation of those from U.S. 212.

In the concurrency with I-494, the MN 5 shield is placed at most, but not all, interchanges. In 2007, new gore signs placed on France Avenue in Bloomington at its interchange with I-494 do not mention the Highway 5 concurrency, whereas the older signs they replaced did. The more recent interchange with Lyndale Ave (2009) displays the names of both highways.

In June 2015, it was announced that Highway 5 will be shortened by 8.3 miles by the state of Minnesota, giving the portion from Minnesota 120 to its eastern conterminous at Minnesota 36 to Washington County. The road is known as 34th St. between Jamaca Ave and Highway 120 and Stillwater Blvd. between Jamaca Ave. and Highway 36. The road is an extension of Washington County Roads 14 and 15. This road is designated from the county line to Manning Ave. as County Road 14 and from Manning Ave. to Highway 36 as County Road 15. This piece of the highway that will be returned to the county was originally marked as Minnesota 212. This portion of highway is now marked with county highway signs as well as Old Highway 5 signs.

Major intersections
All exits are unnumbered except for the I-494 overlap.

References

External links

Minnesota Highway 5 at MN Highway Endings

005
Transportation in Carver County, Minnesota
Transportation in Hennepin County, Minnesota
Transportation in Ramsey County, Minnesota
Transportation in Saint Paul, Minnesota
Transportation in Sibley County, Minnesota
Transportation in Washington County, Minnesota
Chanhassen, Minnesota